Hungary–Sweden relations are foreign relations between Hungary and Sweden. Sweden has an embassy in Budapest. Diplomatic relations between the two countries started on 28 December 1945. These relations developed to a higher ambassador level. In Stockholm there is a Hungarian embassy. Both countries are members of the Council of Europe, European Union and Organization for Security and Co-operation in Europe.

History

Raoul Wallenberg between July and December 1944 issued protective passports and housed Jews, saving tens of thousands of Jewish lives in Hungary from the Swedish embassy.

Formal diplomatic relations 

Diplomatic relations between the two countries started on 28 December 1945. Both nations maintain ambassador level embassies in each other's capitals, Budapest and Stockholm.

The King of Sweden visited in October 1996. Björn von Sydow, who was the Swedish defence minister in Göran Persson's government between 1997 and 2002 took a formal visit in Budapest in 1996.

Anna Lindh, the Swedish Minister for Foreign Affairs, was murdered in Stockholm, and the Hungarian Minister for Foreign Affairs honored her with a memorial on 28 May 2004 in Budapest's City Park.

International agreements and organisations 

After the revolutions of 1989 and the fall of the Soviet Union in 1991, Hungary and Sweden saw fit to join several of the same intergovernmental organisations.

Council of Europe 

Sweden was a founding member of Council of Europe on 5 May 1949. Hungary joined on 6 November 1990.

European Union 
Sweden joined the European Union on 1 January 1995, alongside Austria and Finland, while Hungary joined the EU on 1 May 2004 alongside 9 other (mostly former Soviet) states.

North Atlantic Treaty Organisation 

Hungary joined NATO alongside Poland and the Czech Republic on 12 March 1999 in the fourth enlargement of NATO.

Sweden, along with Finland, applied to join NATO on 17 May 2022, and the two countries were formally invited to join the alliance when the accession protocols were signed on 5 July. This started the ratification process in which all 30 current members must approve any applicant if they are to become a member. 28 member states had ratified the Swedish application by 28 September 2022, the confirmations of which were formally registered by 14 October. The last two holdouts were Hungary and Turkey.

The Hungarian government submitted the relevant documents to the National Assembly in July, but the latter declined to process the request before it was prorogued for the year. In October, the Finnish President along with Finnish and Swedish media speculated that Hungary was delaying their approval of the Nordic applications in order to maintain political leverage on EU matters, though they regarded Turkey's approval as a more significant obstacle. The President of Hungary, Viktor Orbán, stated in November that he expected parliament to ratify Swedish accession when they reconvene in mid-February.

On 22 January 2023, the Swedish Foreign Minister stated that the negotiations with Turkey were "nearly resolved", and that it was "now very close to the moment in time when it is time for the Turkish parliament to start the ratification process".

Military relations 

Both Hungary and Sweden have been aligned with NATO in the post-Cold War era. Hungary joined NATO in 1999, and Sweden applied to join in 2022.

Saab JAS 39 Gripen 

Shortly after Hungary joined NATO in 1999, a push was made to replace the Air Force's MiG-29 fleet with a NATO-compatible fighter force. By 2001, several offers had been received, including a Swedish offer of 24 JAS 39 C/D's, and a US offer of 24 used F-16's. Despite the fact that the professional committees favored the F-16, on 10 September 2001, the Swedish bid won. On 20 December 2001, Hungary signed a contract with the Swedish Government in order to lease 14 JAS 39 Gripens, for 12 years beginning in 2006. By December 2007 all 14 jets had been delivered.

In 2012, Hungary decided to extend the lease until March of 2026. The aircraft were upgraded in 2017 and 2022. After the lease period expires, Hungary will own the remaining Gripens.

See also 
 Foreign relations of Hungary
 Foreign relations of Sweden
 Hungarian diaspora

References

External links 
 Hungarian-Swedish relations
 Sweden office and relation with Hungary 
 swedenabroad.com/budapest

 
Sweden
Bilateral relations of Sweden